Stockholms nation is a student society and one of thirteen nations at Uppsala University. The nation has its origins in the mid-17th century and regards 1649 as its official date of foundation, although this is uncertain. A document in the archives mentions students enrolled in the nation in 1649, but this is a copy of an original that was lost in a fire in 1702, and the nation is mentioned in the protocols of the consistory (board) of the university from 1656 as having been in existence for three years, which would put the foundation date at about 1653.

The old part of the nation building was designed by architect Johan Fredrik Åbom, and was completed in 1848. A new wing of the nation building, begun in 1961, is designed by modernist architect Peter Celsing.

Former curators (chairmen) of the nation include the mathematician Gösta Mittag-Leffler, the economist Knut Wicksell and the author Gösta Knutsson. The songwriter Carl Michael Bellman was enrolled in Stockholms nation during his brief period as a student in Uppsala (1758–1759).

Inspektors
 Stockholms nation

Notes

Nations at Uppsala University
Organizations established in 1649
1649 establishments in Sweden
Student organizations established in the 17th century